Piyam railway station (Persian:ايستگاه راه آهن پیام, Istgah-e Rah Ahan-e Piyam) is located at the village of Piyam south of Marand, East Azerbaijan Province. The station is owned by IRI Railway.

References

External links

Railway stations in Iran